Oia is a municipality in the province of Pontevedra in the autonomous community of Galicia, in Spain. It is situated in the comarca of O Baixo Miño. The Royal Monastery of Santa María de Oia is located in Oia.

References

Municipalities in the Province of Pontevedra